QtJambi is a Java binding of the cross-platform application framework Qt. It enables Java developers to use Qt within Java programming language. In addition, QtJambi generator can be used to create Java bindings for other Qt libraries and future versions of Qt. Unlike GTK there are no Swing LAF implementations that use Qt for rendering.

QtJambi supports Linux and other flavours of Unix such as macOS, as well as Microsoft Windows.

QtJambi was originally developed by TrollTech (currently known as "The Qt Company") until March 2009, but it didn't continue after being bought by Nokia, official support for QtJambi by Nokia ended in March 2010. The project was spun off into the open source project, which was later adopted by Omix Visualization.

QtJambi  hello world 
package org.wikipedia.qt;

import io.qt.widgets.*;
public class Test {
	public static void main(String[] args) {
		QApplication.initialize(args);
		QMessageBox.information(null, "QtJambi", "Hello World!");
		QApplication.shutdown();
	}
}

References

External links

 QtJambi fork with support for Qt5 and Qt6 at GitHub
 Latest QtJambi reference documentation
 Legacy QtJambi source code repository at GitHub
 Legacy QtJambi 4.5 reference documentation

Articles with example Java code
Java APIs
Qt (software)